Franklin Township is one of the twenty-two townships of Tuscarawas County, Ohio, United States.  The 2000 census found 4,244 people in the township, 1,934 of whom lived in the unincorporated portions of the township.

Geography
Located in the northwestern part of the county, it borders the following townships:
Bethlehem Township, Stark County - northeast
Lawrence Township - east
Dover Township - southeast
Sugar Creek Township - southwest
Wayne Township - west
Sugar Creek Township, Stark County - northwest

The village of Strasburg is located in eastern Franklin Township.

Name and history
It is one of twenty-one Franklin Townships statewide.

Government
The township is governed by a three-member board of trustees, who are elected in November of odd-numbered years to a four-year term beginning on the following January 1. Two are elected in the year after the presidential election and one is elected in the year before it. There is also an elected township fiscal officer, who serves a four-year term beginning on April 1 of the year after the election, which is held in November of the year before the presidential election. Vacancies in the fiscal officership or on the board of trustees are filled by the remaining trustees.  The current trustees are Max Bonifant, Randy Fearon, and Douglas Gene Hensel, and the fiscal officer is Tammy Spidell.

References

External links
County website

Townships in Tuscarawas County, Ohio
Townships in Ohio